This is a list of upsets by teams seeded 11 or higher that have occurred in the NCAA Division I women's basketball tournament since the tournament expanded to 64 teams in 1994. In 2022 it expanded to 68 teams.

First round

16 vs. 1
The first 16 seed ever to win a game in an NCAA Division I basketball tournament was Harvard in 1998 against Stanford. According to an Associated Press retrospective on the 10th anniversary of the game in 2008, "The difference between the teams was much smaller than usual for a No. 1 and a 16 seed."

Harvard had two years of tournament experience and the nation's leading scorer that season in Allison Feaster. Stanford suffered two devastating injuries during the run-up to the tournament. First, Vanessa Nygaard tore an ACL in the Cardinal's final regular-season game against Oregon State. Because the extent of her injury was not known at the time the tournament field was selected, the Cardinal still received a 1 seed. Then, in the team's first practice after the tournament selection, leading scorer and rebounder Kristin Folkl also tore an ACL.

15 vs. 2 and 14 vs. 3 
Unlike the men's tournament, in which twenty-two (22) 14 seeds have won their opening games since that tournament expanded to 64 teams in 1985, no 14 seed has ever won a game in the women's tournament.

Ten (10) 15 seeds have won their opening games in the men's tournament since that tournament expanded to 64 teams in 1985, but no 15 seed has ever won a game in the women's tournament. The closest any 15 seed came to winning was in 2017, when Long Beach State lost 56–55 to Oregon State.

13 vs. 4
Seven 13 seeds have defeated 4 seeds in the first round.

By contrast, the men's tournament has seen 23 such upsets since 1994. Eight more occurred between 1985 and 1993, when the men's tournament featured 64 teams but the women's tournament had fewer entrants (32 in 1985, 40 from 1986 to 1988, and 48 from 1989 to 1993).

12 vs. 5
There have been twenty-four (24) 12 seeds to defeat 5 seeds in the first round. The men's tournament has seen forty-four (44) such wins since 1994, with nine more taking place between 1985 and 1993.

11 vs. 6
Thirty-five 11 seeds have won their first-round games against 6 seeds. By contrast, 44 such upsets have occurred in the men's tournament since 1994, with 13 more occurring between 1985 and 1993.

Second round

16 seeds

Harvard, the only 16 seed to advance to the second round, lost to Arkansas in the second round. A 16 seed has never advanced to the Sweet Sixteen in either the men's or women's tournaments.

15 and 14 seeds
Unlike the men's tournament, in which three 15 seeds and two 14 seeds have won their second-round games since that tournament expanded to 64 teams in 1985, no 14 or 15 seed has ever won a game in that round.

13 seeds
Three 13 seeds have won their second-round games, compared to six in the men's tournament (five of which occurred since 1998). All three of the winning 13 seeds in the women's tournament defeated 5 seeds.

12 seeds
Four 12 seeds have won their second-round games, as opposed to 15 in the men's tournament since 1994 and seven more from 1985 to 1993. All four 12 seeds to win at this stage of the women's tournament defeated 4 seeds.

11 seeds
A total of twelve 11 seeds have won their second-round games and advanced to the Sweet 16. This compares to 19 in the men's tournament since 1994, with seven more occurring between 1985 and 1993.

Since no 14 seed has ever advanced to this point in the women's tournament, all defeated teams were 3 seeds.

Sweet Sixteen

15, 14, and 13 seeds
No 15 seed has ever won in the Sweet 16, compared to the men's tournament in which only one 15 seed, Saint Peter's, advanced to the Elite Eight. To date, no 14 or 13 seed, in either the men's or women's tournament, has advanced to the regional finals.

12 seeds
Unlike the men's tournament, in which two 12 seeds won its Sweet 16 game since 1985, no 12 seed has ever won a game in this round in the women's tournament.

Both 12 seeds defeated 8 seeds in the men's tournament. However, all four 12 seeds met 1 seeds on the women's side. No 12 seeds has ever defeated a 1 in either the men's or women's tournament in this round.

11 seeds
Only one team seeded 11 or lower has won in the Sweet 16 and advanced to the Elite Eight—11 seed Gonzaga in 2011, who defeated 7 seed Louisville. By contrast, seven such teams have won at this stage in the men's tournament since 1994, with two more doing so from 1985 to 1993.

Elite Eight
No team seeded 10 or lower has ever advanced to the Final Four; Gonzaga lost its 2011 regional final 83–60 to Stanford. Creighton lost their Elite Eight matchup to #1 South Carolina in 2022, 80-50. Oregon lost its regional final to UConn, 90–52, in 2017, as a 10 seed, and Lamar, also a 10 seed, lost their regional final in 1991. In the men's tournament, five 11 seeds and one 10 seed have advanced to the Final Four—10th seed Syracuse in 2016, and 11th seeds UCLA in 2021, Loyola-Chicago in 2018, VCU in 2011, George Mason in 2006, and LSU in 1986. The lowest seed to advance to the Final Four in the Women's Tournament is Arkansas, in 1998. The Razorbacks were a 9 seed that season.

See also
 NCAA Division I men's basketball tournament upsets

References

External links
 

Upsets
College women's basketball records and statistics in the United States
College basketball in the United States lists